Subba Shastry is a 1966 Indian Kannada-language film, directed  and produced by M. V. Krishnaswamy. The film is based on the novel Aashadhabhoothi by A. N. Murthy Rao. The film stars Kalyan Kumar, K. S. Ashwath, Arunkumar, Chandrakala, Harini, Mynavathi and Shivaraj.The film has musical score by Veena Doreswamy Iyengar and S. Krishnamurthy with the title song sung by the Smt. Srirangam Gopalaratnam.

Cast

Kalyan Kumar
K. S. Ashwath
Arunkumar
Shivaraj
G. V. Shivanand
M. S. Subbanna
L. N. Swamy
Harini
Chandrakala
Lakshmamma
Mynavathi in Guest Appearance
K. B. Gopinath
M. R. Subramanyam
K. N. Shanthadevi
Sharada
Indira
Bhargavi Narayan

Soundtrack
The music was composed by Veena Doreswamy Iyengar and S. Krishnamurthy.

References

External links
 

1960s Kannada-language films